Joint Program Executive Office for Chemical, Biological, Radiological and Nuclear Defense (JPEO-CBRND) is a sub-office of the ASA(ALT). 

The Joint Program Executive Office for Chemical, Biological, Radiological and Nuclear Defense is the Joint Service’s lead for development, acquisition, fielding and life-cycle support of chemical, biological, radiological and nuclear defense equipment and medical countermeasures.

References 

United States Department of Defense